Karoline Borgersen (born 1 July 1976) is a Norwegian former professional tennis player.

Biography
A right-handed player from Oslo, Borgersen debuted for the Norway Fed Cup team in 1994, but didn't tour professionally until 2004, having spent many of the previous years playing college tennis in California. She started at Pepperdine, then transferred to UC Berkeley, where she was a doubles All-American in 1999-2000.

Borgersen reached a best singles ranking of 389 on the professional circuit and won three ITF titles in doubles. A former Norwegian number one, she twice featured in the singles qualifying draw for the Nordic Light Open, a WTA Tour tournament held in Stockholm.

In 2006, she made her last Fed Cup appearance, having featured in a total of 26 ties, for 12 singles and nine doubles wins.

ITF finals

Singles (0–1)

Doubles (3–4)

References

External links
 
 
 

1976 births
Living people
Norwegian female tennis players
Sportspeople from Oslo
Pepperdine Waves women's tennis players
California Golden Bears women's tennis players
Norwegian expatriate sportspeople in the United States